The Jenin Brigades, or Jenin Battalion (Arabic: كتيبة جنين, romanized: Katībat Ǧinīn), is a newly established Palestinian militant group. It was founded in Jenin in 2021 by Jamil Al-Amouri, a militant of the Palestinian Islamic Jihad (PIJ). The organization is based in the Jenin refugee camp in the North of the West Bank.

History and background 
The Jenin Brigades, believed to be established in the Jenin refugee camp by Jamil al-Amouri before his death in June 2021, were first reported following their participation in the escape of Palestinian prisoners from the Israeli Gilboa prison on the 6th of September 2021.

Activities 
The Jenin Brigades have engaged in armed skirmishes with Israeli forces.

Ideology 
The Jenin Brigades’ claim is that they “are the resistance”. They call for armed resistance and invite the Palestinian authorities to take part in the movement.

Members

Mateen Dabaya 
Mateen Dabaya was recognized by the Jenin Brigades as a leader of the group. He was killed in October 2022, at the age of 20, during a military operation carried out by the Israeli forces in the Jenin refugee camp.

Attacks 

 Kidnapping of Tiran Fero, a 17-year old Israeli Druze student

See also 
Lions' Den (militant group)
Timeline of the Israeli–Palestinian conflict in 2022

References

Military units and formations established in 2021
2021 establishments in Asia
Palestinian militant groups